Inchathotty is a village located near Neriamangalam, Thattekad and Kothamangalam in Ernakulam District in Kerala, India. It is famous for its hanging bridge (suspension bridge) which is considered as the longest suspension bridge in Kerala, with a length of about 183 m and width of about 1.2 m (4 feet). The village is blessed with rich flora and fauna.

This village is located at a distance of about 10 km from Thattekkad Bird Sanctuary and 60 km from the world-famous Munnar hill station.
The famous Bhoothathankettu dam and park can also be conveniently accessed at about 11 km distance.

References 

Villages in Ernakulam district